Millers Point is an inner-city suburb of Sydney, in the state of New South Wales, Australia. It is on the north-western edge of the Sydney central business district, adjacent to The Rocks and is part of the local government area of the City of Sydney.

Millers Point lies on the southern shore of Sydney Harbour, beside Darling Harbour. The Barangaroo development is taking place on 22 hectares of land on the western side of the suburb. Sections of Millers Point have been included as part of The Rocks area in the past and some residents and businesses still use it in their address.

History
On 30 June 1814 Thomas Miller, a Sergeant in the 73rd Regiment of Foot, received a grant of land from the governor.
A small mill that was owned by an ex-convict, Jack Leighton was located here. The area became known as Jack, the Miller's Point. In 1833 Governor Bourke granted the Catholic Church land at Millers Point for the construction of a school house that could serve as a chapel on Sundays. The Colonial Architect, Ambrose Hallen in consultation with Bishop Ullathorne, designed the school building which was completed by May 1835. It was a one-story building constructed in sandstone with two rooms that could be opened into one. St Brigid's Church is one of the oldest existing place of Catholic worship in Australia.  The school was closed in 1992 but the church continues to be used by the local community.

From 1841 to 1921, Miller's Point was the location of a gasworks owned by the Australian Gaslight Company.

The current Sydney Observatory building on Observatory Hill was completed in 1858 by English astronomer and clergyman William Scott. Also on Observatory Hill is the old Fort Street School, converted from the old Military Hospital at Fort Phillip in the 1850s. Fort Street School incorporated the first government secondary school in Australia, and after the secondary school moved out in 1975, its building has housed the National Trust of Australia; the primary school remains nearby in a separate, heritage listed, building.

Two separate pubs in the area claim to be Sydney's oldest surviving pubs, the Lord Nelson (built in about 1836, but modified since) at Millers Point and the Fortune of War (which was built in its current form in 1922, although a hotel was operating on the site in 1830) nearby at The Rocks. Other active pubs in the area include the Palisade, the Hero of Waterloo and the Captain Cook.

Population
At the 2021 census, the population of Millers Point was 1,735.

In the 2016 census, there were 1,482 people in Millers Point. 42.5% of people were born in Australia and 59.9% of people only spoke English at home.  The most common response for religion was No Religion at 29.3%.

Protests

A protest movement developed from 2008 when various governments announced plans to lease and sell Millers Point, Dawes Point and The Rocks properties and move existing public housing tenants. "Save Our Community", "Friends of Millers Point" and the associated "Save Our Sirius" formed to protest relocation of residents.

Heritage listings

Millers Point has a number of heritage-listed sites, including:

 Millers Point Conservation Area

 1, 3, 5, 7 Argyle Place: 1-7 Argyle Place, Millers Point
 6, 8 Argyle Place: 6-8 Argyle Place, Millers Point
 9 Argyle Place: 9 Argyle Place, Millers Point
 10, 10a, 12, 12a Argyle Place: 10-12a Argyle Place, Millers Point
 22, 24, 26, 30, 32 Argyle Place: 22-32 Argyle Place, Millers Point
 34 Argyle Place: Osborne House
 36, 38 Argyle Place: 36-38 Argyle Place, Millers Point
 40, 42, 44 Argyle Place: 40-44 Argyle Place, Millers Point
 46, 48 Argyle Place: 46-48 Argyle Place, Millers Point
 50 Argyle Place: Undercliffe Cottage
 52, 54, 56, 58, 60 Argyle Place: Undercliffe Terrace
 62, 64 Argyle Place: 62-64 Argyle Place, Millers Point
 Argyle Street: Garrison Anglican Church Precinct 
 35-37 Bettington Street: Palisade Hotel 
 56, 58, 60 Bettington Street: 56-60 Bettington Street, Millers Point
 66, 68 Bettington Street: 66-68 Bettington Street, Millers Point
 7, 9, 11, 13 Dalgety Road: 7-13 Dalgety Road, Millers Point
 15, 17, 19, 21, 23, 25 Dalgety Road: 15-25 Dalgety Road, Millers Point
 27a, 29a, 31a, 33, 35a Dalgety Road: 27a-35a Dalgety Road, Millers Point
 Hickson Road: Grafton Bond Store
 Hickson Road: Walsh Bay Wharves Precinct
 2-36 High Street: 2-36 High Street, Millers Point
 3, 5, 7, 9 High Street: 3-9 High Street, Millers Point
 38-72 High Street: 38-72 High Street, Millers Point
 74-80 High Street: 74-80 High Street, Millers Point
 2-4 Jenkins Street: MSB Stores Complex
 1-17 Kent Street: Oswald Bond Store
 12 Kent Street: Millers Point Post Office 
 14, 16 Kent Street: St Brigid's Roman Catholic Church 
 18, 20, 22 Kent Street: 18-22 Kent Street, Millers Point
 19 Kent Street: Lord Nelson Hotel 
 21, 23, 25, 27, 29 Kent Street: 21-29 Kent Street, Millers Point
 24, 26 Kent Street: House of Bodleigh
 28 Kent Street: 28 Kent Street, Millers Point
 30 Kent Street: 30 Kent Street, Millers Point
 32, 34, 36, 38, 40 Kent Street: 32-40 Kent Street, Millers Point
 33, 35 Kent Street: Captain Cook Hotel 
 37, 39, 41, 43, 45, 47 Kent Street: Alfred's Terrace
 42 Kent Street: 42 Kent Street, Millers Point
 44 Kent Street: 44 Kent Street, Millers Point
 46 Kent Street: 46 Kent Street, Millers Point
 48, 50 Kent Street: 48-50 Kent Street, Millers Point
 49, 51 Kent Street: 49-51 Kent Street, Millers Point
 52, 54 Kent Street: 52-54 Kent Street, Millers Point
 53, 55 Kent Street: 53-55 Kent Street, Millers Point
 56, 58 Kent Street: 56-58 Kent Street, Millers Point
 59, 61, 63 Kent Street: Hexam Terrace
 60, 62 Kent Street: 60-62 Kent Street, Millers Point
 71, 73 Kent Street: 71-73 Kent Street, Millers Point
 75, 77, 79 Kent Street: Winsbury Terrace
 81 Kent Street: Katoomba House
 82, 84, 86, 88 Kent Street: Blyth Terrace
 83, 85 Kent Street: 83-85 Kent Street, Millers Point
 90, 92 Kent Street: 90-92 Kent Street, Millers Point
 94 Kent Street: Toxteth
 115, 117, 119, 121 Kent Street: 115-121 Kent Street, Millers Point
 123, 125 Kent Street: 123-125 Kent Street, Millers Point
 1-19 Lower Fort Street: Milton Terrace
 18 Lower Fort Street: Harbour View Hotel 
 20 Lower Fort Street: 20 Lower Fort Street, Millers Point
 21, 23 Lower Fort Street: 21-23 Lower Fort Street, Millers Point
 22 Lower Fort Street: 22 Lower Fort Street, Millers Point
 24, 26 Lower Fort Street: 24-26 Lower Fort Street, Millers Point
 25, 27, 29, 31, 33, 35 Lower Fort Street: Linsley Terrace
 28 Lower Fort Street: 28 Lower Fort Street, Millers Point
 30, 32, 34, 36, 38, 40, 42 Lower Fort Street: 30-42 Lower Fort Street, Millers Point
 39, 41 Lower Fort Street: 39-41 Lower Fort Street, Millers Point
 43 Lower Fort Street: Clydebank
 47, 49, 51, 53 Lower Fort Street: 47-53 Lower Fort Street, Millers Point
 55 Lower Fort Street: 55 Lower Fort Street, Millers Point
 57, 59, 61 Lower Fort Street: Regency Townhouses
 63, 65 Lower Fort Street: Vermont Terrace
 67, 69, 71, 73 Lower Fort Street: Eagleton Terrace
 75, 77 Lower Fort Street: 75-77 Lower Fort Street, Millers Point
 79 Lower Fort Street: 79 Lower Fort Street, Millers Point
 81, 83 Lower Fort Street: Hero of Waterloo Hotel 
 85 Lower Fort Street: Argyle House
 14-16 Merriman Street: 14-16 Merriman Street, Millers Point
 18 Merriman Street: 18 Merriman Street, Millers Point
 20, 22, 24, 26, 28, 30, 32, 34, 36, 38, 40, 42, 44, 48 Merriman Street: Merriman Street Terraces
 Munn Street: Dalgety's Bond Stores
 18, 18a, 20, 20a Munn Street: 18-20a Munn Street, Millers Point
 Sydney Harbour Bridge (southern approaches/exits)
 Trinity Avenue: Argyle Street Railway Substation
 2, 4 Trinity Avenue: 2-4 Trinity Avenue, Millers Point
 8, 10, 12 Trinity Avenue: Darling House 
 14, 16, 18, 20, 22 Trinity Avenue: 14-22 Trinity Avenue, Millers Point
 Upper Fort Street: Millers Point & Dawes Point Village Precinct
 Upper Fort Street: Sydney Observatory 
 1-63 Windmill Street: 1-63 Windmill Street, Millers Point
 65 Windmill Street: 65 Windmill Street, Millers Point
 67 Windmill Street: 67 Windmill Street, Millers Point
 69 Windmill Street: 69 Windmill Street, Millers Point
 71 Windmill Street: 71 Windmill Street, Millers Point
 73 Windmill Street: Stevens Terrace
 75 Windmill Street: Shipwrights Arms Inn 
 82-84 Windmill Street: 82-84 Windmill Street, Millers Point
 86, 88 Windmill Street: 86-88 Windmill Street, Millers Point
 90-92 Windmill Street: 90-92 Windmill Street, Millers Point

In addition, the following Millers Point buildings are listed on various other heritage registers:
 Agar Steps and houses
 Argyle Cut and Argyle Street Space
 10-114A Kent Street: Carlson Terrace
 116-122 Kent Street: Richmond Villa
 124-134 Kent Street: Glover cottages
 National Trust Centre (former Fort Street School), including S.H. Ervin Gallery

Gallery

See also
 Barangaroo, New South Wales
 Sirius building (with other public housing in Millers Point, threatened by sell-off during 2014)

References

Further reading
 Brodsky, Isadore. Heart of the Rocks. Old Sydney Free Press, Australia. 1965.
 Fitzgerald, Shirley; Keating, Christopher. Millers Point, The Urban Village. Hale & Iremonger, Australia,1991.
 Karskens, Grace. Inside The Rocks. Published by Hale & Iremonger, Australia. 1999.

External links

  [CC-By-SA]
 [CC-By-SA]
 [CC-By-SA]
 

 
Suburbs of Sydney
Millers Point Conservation Area